The Big Fat Quiz of the Year is an approximately annual British television programme broadcast in the last or first week of the year on Channel 4. The show is a comedy panel game in the style of a pub quiz. Three teams of two celebrities, mostly comedians, are asked questions about the year gone by in various categories, writing answers on an electronic board in front of them. At the end of each round the answers are displayed and points awarded.

The first edition was broadcast in December 2004. There has been another at around the end of each year, as well as a special edition in November 2007 for Channel 4's 25th anniversary celebrations and three themed special editions in September 2012, to celebrate Channel 4's first three decades.  A second set of 'decades' editions screened in September 2013 as well as a 10th-anniversary special in January 2015; and a Big Fat Quiz of Everything in January 2016, followed by a series of three episodes in August 2016. Repeats can usually be found days later on Channel 4's sister channel E4 and/or 4seven. Stand-up comedian Jimmy Carr has been the host and quizmaster of each edition to date. Channel 4 has made full episodes of The Big Fat Quiz of the Year available to view on All 4.

Editions

The Big Fat Quiz of the Year

2004

The first Big Fat Quiz was broadcast on 27 December 2004. Louis Walsh, Nadia Almada and Dame Kelly Holmes all made live appearances to read out the answers for the months of March, June and August respectively. Recorded questions from Bono, Derren Brown and The Bear from Bo' Selecta! were shown too along with films of Richard and Judy discussing events. The children of Mitchell Brook Primary School in Neasden acted out news stories that happened throughout the year, such as Ricky Gervais winning two Golden Globe Awards for The Office and the Momart fire.

2005

Guest questioners in the studio included Jordan & Peter Andre and David Tennant. There were also recorded questions by several celebrities including Richard and Judy, Charlotte Church, Cameron Diaz, Toni Collette, Derren Brown and Kevin Pietersen. The mystery guests were Walter Wolfgang and a woman genuinely named Sue Doku. This year's quiz saw the debut of Jon Snow giving fake news stories based on song lyrics, with "I Predict A Riot" and "Crazy Chick". The children of Mitchell Brook Primary School acted out the birth of David and Victoria Beckham's third child and Jacques Chirac insulting British food on the eve of the G8 Summit.

2006

In 2006, the show was broadcast on 27 December. Guest questioners in the studio included Boy George, Myleene Klass and Matt Willis. The mystery guest was Guy Goma, famous for mistakenly appearing as a guest on BBC News 24. Pre-recorded questions were asked by Lily Allen, Carol Vorderman, Courtney Love, Girls Aloud, and Sacha Baron Cohen (in character as Borat). Channel 4 News reporter Jon Snow returned to give fake news reports about songs of the year, reporting on "Patience" and "America". The children of Mitchell Brook Primary School acted out The Da Vinci Code plagiarism claim and parents rebelling against Jamie Oliver's school dinners campaign. Ian McKellen gave dramatized readings from the autobiographies of Jade Goody and Kerry Katona.

Russell Brand and Noel Fielding spent much of the show giving deliberately wrong – and surreal – answers, leaving them trailing far behind the other two teams. This was until towards the end when Jimmy Carr bowed to the pressure of the studio audience and gave them 22 points for answering one question correctly, which was the amount needed to bring them back into contention at the time and ensuring that they subsequently won the quiz. This led Walliams and Brydon, who came last as a result, to exaggerate their chagrin at the turn of events that had seen Brand and Fielding emerge on top.

During a discussion about the Bob Skeleton event at that year's Winter Olympics, the suggestion arose that a character with that name could be the star of Brand and Fielding's next show together. The pair subsequently became known as the Goth Detectives (opposed to their original name, which arose from a joke Jimmy Carr made about their supposed parentage), which was suggested for the show's title. Though it began as a joke, the pair eventually performed a Goth Detectives sketch for the Teenage Cancer Trust event at the Royal Albert Hall on 28 March 2007.

2007
 
The 2007 show aired on 30 December 2007.  Guest questioners in the studio were Christopher Biggins, Cerys Matthews and John Smeaton, a baggage handler at Glasgow Airport who helped foil a terrorist attack. Pre-recorded questions were asked by Take That, Gordon Ramsay and Thom Yorke. Jon Snow returned with a faux news report on "Umbrella". John Hurt read out extracts from the autobiographies of Peter Andre and 50 Cent. The children of Mitchell Brook Primary School returned to act out David Beckham's move to LA Galaxy and when a judge criticised The Jeremy Kyle Show. Paul Croft, the man who had a tattoo of Dumbledore done on his back before J.K. Rowling announced that Dumbledore was gay, was the mystery guest.

This was the first time that Rob Brydon had been on the winning team, despite having appeared on the panel every year since the first show in 2004. Also, it was the first time (and, as of the 2018 edition, the only time) that the previous year's winning team – the Goth Detectives – had both returned to try to defend their title.

2008
 
The Big Fat Quiz of the Year 2008 aired on 28 December on Channel 4 at 9:00 pm.

Due to the furore caused by his and Russell Brand's infamous phone call to actor Andrew Sachs, which resulted in his three-month suspension from the BBC at the end of the year, this was the first occasion that Jonathan Ross did not appear. He also declined his customary executive producer credit. Despite Big Fat Quiz not being a BBC programme, Ross himself had thought it inappropriate to do any broadcasting work during the corporation's censure (the same reason that was given for his decision to temporarily concede hosting duties of the British Comedy Awards – broadcast on ITV – around the same time).

This was also the first year that Rob Brydon was absent, leaving host Jimmy Carr as the only regular fixture throughout the Big Fat Quiz of the Years entire run to date (although neither Brydon nor Ross had been panellists for the special Channel 4 anniversary edition).

In-studio guest questions came from Strictly Come Dancing contestants Jodie Kidd and Mark Foster, and 2008 Olympics Team GB gold medalists Christine Ohuruogu and James DeGale. Pre-recorded guest questions came from Katy Perry, the Fonejacker, Alan Carr, Sarah Silverman and Sir Alan Sugar. Jon Snow gave news reports on "That's Not My Name" and "I Kissed A Girl". John Hurt read from the autobiographies of Les Dennis and Christopher Biggins. The children from Mitchell Brook Primary School also returned acting out the divorce of Paul McCartney and Heather Mills and Jay-Z headlining that year's Glastonbury Festival.

2009
 
The 2009 show was recorded on 7 December and aired on 1 January 2010.

Peter Andre appeared in-studio as a guest questioner. Newsreader Jon Snow again appeared with news reports on "Poker Face" and "Bonkers" and the children of Mitchell Brook Primary School also reprised their regular slot, acting out the Parliament expenses scandal and Kanye West invading the stage at the MTV Video Music Awards. Pre-recorded guest questions came from Tim Minchin (asking a question in song about Google Street View), Sir David Attenborough, Stuart Broad, David Tennant and 50 Cent. Swansea cagefighters Daniel Lerwell and James Lilley, who successfully fended off a homophobic attack in a nightclub when they were dressed in drag for a stag night, were the mystery guests.

Ross and Brand made a number of references to the Sachsgate scandal of 2008 which occurred last time they appeared together. There was also a discussion about changing Brooker and Mitchell's team name to The Curmudgeons after they refused to dance to the Lady Gaga song "Poker Face".

Mitchell and Brooker were the eventual winners and were asked by Jimmy Carr after their victory if they wanted to do a dance. Despite pressure from the audience, they kept up their premise of not dancing.

2010
 
The 2010 show was recorded on 13 December and aired on 3 January 2011.

Guest questions were provided by Nicole Scherzinger, Jack Black, Simon Pegg, Russell Brand, Seth Rogen, the cast of Misfits and Will Ferrell. The children of Mitchell Brook Primary School made their annual appearance acting out news stories, which included The Stig scandal and the Icelandic volcano eruption, as did Jon Snow with his fake news report of Lady Gaga and Beyoncé's "Telephone". Lola, the cat put in a wheelie bin in August by Mary Bale appeared as a mystery guest. Louie Spence posed a question in the form of a dance routine representing the story of the trapped Chilean miners.

2011
 
The 2011 show was recorded on 14 December and aired on 27 December 2011.

Guest questions were provided by Cee Lo Green, Michael Sheen, Tulisa, Lee Evans, Muppet drummer Animal, Rastamouse, Downton Abbey star Jim Carter, Lenny Kravitz, and Professor Brian Cox. The children of Mitchell Brook Primary School acted out the arrival of Larry the Cat at 10 Downing Street and Cheryl Cole's firing from The X Factor, and Jon Snow gave his news reports on Rebecca Black's "Friday" and Jessie J's "Price Tag". "Supergran" Ann Timson, who was seen in a February 2011 viral video fending off four burglars with just her handbag, appeared as a mystery guest. The Only Way Is Essex cast members Lydia Rose Bright, Lauren Goodger, and Kirk Norcross appeared to present a question about the show.

Hart and Walliams hold the record for first team to not reach double digits and the lowest score of any team in the show's run.

David Mitchell and Eddie Izzard were that year's winners.

2012
 
The 2012 edition aired on 30 December 2012. The teams did not take team names. 
The in-studio final bonus questions were provided by Team GB and Paralympics GB athletes Nicola Adams, Natasha Baker, Sophie Christiansen, Hannah Cockroft, Helen Glover, Ed McKeever, Etienne Stott, and Peter Wilson. The Great British Bake Off finalists Brendan Lynch, James Morton, and John Whaite provided a live guest question. Recorded guest questions were provided by PSY, Gerard Butler, Usain Bolt, Jessica Ennis, Felix Baumgartner, Kylie Minogue, Cheryl Cole, Simon Callow, Jenson Button, Tom Daley, Warwick Davis, and Charles Dance (doing a dramatic reading from Fifty Shades of Grey). The children of Mitchell Brook Primary School once again made an appearance acting out the Diamond Jubilee Concert. Providing the song lyric as news story segment was Jon Snow, reporting on "Call Me Maybe". The mystery guest was Gary Connery, the stunt-double for the Queen, who skydived out of a helicopter during the 2012 Olympics opening ceremony.

During the show, Whitehall and Corden had pizza delivered and ate it with red wine.

2013
 
The 2013 edition was recorded on 10 December and aired on 26 December 2013. The teams did not take team names.

Danny Dyer appeared in the studio to provide a live guest question. Pre-recorded guest questions were provided by Russell Brand, Anchorman 2 stars Steve Carell, Will Ferrell, and Paul Rudd; Olly Murs, Christine Ohuruogu, Louis Walsh, Richard Osman, The Great Gonzo (promoting Muppets Most Wanted), Harry Hill, and Sophie Ellis-Bextor. Educating Yorkshire teachers Mr Mitchell and Mr Burton, The Great British Bake Off series 4 runner-up Ruby Tandoh, Rizzle Kicks, and astronaut Chris Hadfield. The children of Mitchell Brook Primary School returned to act out Edward Snowden's spy leaks. Jon Snow reported on "Wrecking Ball" and Charles Dance read from the autobiography of Lauren Goodger. The mystery guest was Natalie Holt, who threw eggs at Simon Cowell on the final of Britain's Got Talent.

The show was dedicated to comedy agent and producer Addison Cresswell, who died on 22 December 2013.

Jonathan Ross brought most of a turkey, a loaf of bread and champagne. He ended up making sandwiches for the others.

2014
 
The 2014 edition was recorded on 1 December and aired on 26 December 2014.

Pre-recorded guest questions came from Michael Palin, Tom Daley, the cast of The Inbetweeners, Game of Thrones actress Natalie Dormer, Lily Allen, Rio Ferdinand, Pixie Lott and Status Quo members Francis Rossi and Rick Parfitt. Paralympic gold medallists Kelly Gallagher and Charlotte Evans provided the in-studio guest question. Charles Dance read from the autobiography of Joey Essex. The children of Mitchell Brook Primary School acted out the Bernie Ecclestone trial. Jon Snow gave his news report about "All About That Bass". The mystery guest was Dean Farley, the jogger who ran into David Cameron.

Mel B's performance received notable negative attention on social media and in the press as having brought down the show by being perceived as sour and humorless.

2015
 
The 2015 edition was recorded on 14 December 2015 and aired on 26 December 2015. The teams did not take names.

Pre-recorded guest questions came from Quentin Tarantino, Rita Ora, Simon Pegg, Will Ferrell and Mark Wahlberg, Josh Groban, Olly Murs, Katie Price and Heston Blumenthal. The Great British Bake Off winner, Nadiya Hussain, provided the in-studio guest question. The children of Mitchell Brook Primary School acted out Jeremy Clarkson's dismissal from Top Gear. Jon Snow reported on Drake's "Hotline Bling". Charles Dance read from List of the Lost, the debut novel by Morrissey. The mystery guest was Cecilia Bleasdale, who took a photo of a black and blue dress which appeared white and gold to some people on the photo, leading to the dress becoming an internet meme.

One of the running gags is the panelists deciding to make an alliance against Jimmy by helping Richard & Greg with getting their answers deliberately wrong. Rob even goes far as becoming the host of the program for two minutes however the alliance breaks down after a debate about The Dress.

2016
 
The 2016 edition was recorded on 5 December 2016 and aired on 26 December 2016. The teams did not take names.

Pre-recorded guest questions came from Professor Green, Bryan Cranston and James Franco, The Vamps, Sadiq Khan, Ryan Tedder and Zach Filkins from OneRepublic, Miranda Hart, Gemma Chan, Michelle Keegan and Rick Astley. In-studio guest questions were provided by Mark-Francis Vandelli from Made in Chelsea and Pamela Anderson. The children of Mitchell Brook Primary School acted out Traingate. Jon Snow reported on Justin Timberlake's "Can't Stop the Feeling". Charles Dance read from Rylan's autobiography. The mystery guest was Zac Alsop, who posed as a fencer and blagged his way on to one of Team GB's 2016 Olympics victory parade floats in Manchester.

A running gag on the episode was formed when, as Romesh discussed a new programme featuring his mother, Jimmy asked what Romesh's father thought of the programme, not realising that he had died, leading to the other contestants repeatedly chiding Carr about not checking beforehand. There was also a running "gag" with Mel Giedroyc's obsession with the Crossrail project currently going on in and around London.

2017
 
The 2017 edition was recorded at Television Centre on 6 December 2017 and aired on 26 December 2017.

Pre-recorded guest questions came from Kurupt FM, Vince Vaughn, Nadiya Hussain, Clare Balding, Ed Balls and The Script. The in-studio guest question was asked by Great British Bake Off contestant Liam Charles. The children of Mitchell Brook Primary School acted out the silencing of Big Ben during its renovation. Jon Snow reported on Taylor Swift's "Look What You Made Me Do". Charles Dance read from the autobiography of Geordie Shore star Charlotte Crosby. The mystery guest was Liam Smyth, the student whose date got stuck between two windows trying to throw her poo out after it failed to flush. Helping Jimmy with the final question were some real penguins and an animatronic polar bear.

2018
 
The 2018 edition was recorded at BBC Elstree Studios on 5 December 2018 and aired on 26 December 2018.

Pre-recorded guest questions came from Simon Callow, George Ezra, Alex Jones, Jonas Blue, Joe Sugg, Sheridan Smith, Emma Willis and Georgia Toffolo. In-studio guest questions were asked by Love Island finalists Megan & Wes, Great British Bake Off finalist Kim-Joy Hewlett and Lord Mayor of Sheffield Magid Magid. The children of Mitchell Brook Primary School acted out the England football team's progress in the World Cup for a related question. Jon Snow reported on George Ezra's "Shotgun". Charles Dance read from the new novel by The Only Way Is Essexs Gemma Collins. The mystery guest was Leo Murray, creator of the Trump Baby blimp.

Assisting Jimmy with the final question were the Stan Lee-created Marvel characters Thor, Black Widow, Spider-Man, Black Panther and the Hulk for the teams to guess their aliases. The Hulk then proceeded to rip up the trophy and throw it at the winners before knocking down the wall at the back of the set.

2019

The 2019 edition was recorded at Elstree Studios on 9 December 2019 and aired on 26 December 2019.

Pre-recorded guest questions came from Luke Evans, Naomi Ackie, Louis Walsh, Luke Goss, Adam Lambert and Dina Asher-Smith. An in-studio guest question was asked by RuPaul's Drag Race UK finalist Baga Chipz and winner The Vivienne. The children of Mitchell Brook Primary School acted out the attempted proroguing of Parliament for a related question. Jon Snow reported on Lizzo's "Juice". Charles Dance read from the biography of Dani Dyer. The mystery guest was Jaden Ashman, the teenager who came second in a Fortnite tournament and won £900,000. The Big Fat Question was asked by Strictly Come Dancing contestant Mike Bushell.

2020

The 2020 edition aired on 26 December 2020.

No celebrity guests appeared in studio to ask questions due to the ongoing COVID-19 pandemic. Pre-recorded questions came from Joe Wicks, Bob Odenkirk, Carole Baskin, Laura Whitmore, Craig David, Keith Lemon, KSI, Chris Kamara, Nicola Coughlan, and LadBaby. The children of Mitchell Brook Primary School acted out the Dominic Cummings scandal for a related question. Jon Snow reported on Jawsh 685 and Jason Derulo's "Savage Love (Laxed – Siren Beat)". Charles Dance read from The Meaning of Mariah Carey. The mystery guest was Billy McLean, whose joke WhatsApp voice memo started a false rumour that the British government was planning to combat hunger during lockdown by making a lasagne the size of Wembley Stadium.

The final question was a round named "Trump or Gump" in which the teams had to guess if quotes were said by US President Donald Trump or another notable figure. London wax museum Madame Tussauds lent its figure of Trump as a prop for the round.

2021

The 2021 edition aired on 26 December 2021.

Pre-recorded questions came from Dr. Catherine Green (one of the University of Oxford team responsible for developing the Oxford–AstraZeneca COVID-19 vaccine), Robert Peston, Clara Amfo, Ellie Simmonds, Andi Oliver, Briony May Williams, and Downton Abbey: A New Era'''s Elizabeth McGovern and Laura Carmichael. The children of Mitchell Brook Primary School acted out the 2021 Suez Canal obstruction. Charles Dance read from the autobiography of Alison Hammond. Jackie Weaver of the viral video of a Handforth Parish Council meeting appeared in the studio to ask a question. The mystery guest was Adam Taylor, the owner of the Aberdeen nightclub where Michael Gove was filmed dancing.

The final question was the normal Big Fat Question, but with a time limit set using the Young-hee doll from Squid Game, with any teams failing to finish writing each answer before the doll's head turns back round being docked five points.

2022

The 2022 edition aired on 26 December 2022.

Pre-recorded questions came from Krishnan Guru-Murthy, Luke Evans, the Sugababes, Ellie Goulding, Kate Hudson, Layton Williams, Sigrid, and Jamie Oliver. The children of Mitchell Brook Primary School acted out the Wagatha Christie court case for a related question. Millie Bright appeared in the studio to ask a question. Subwoolfer also appeared in the studio in relation to a question. Charles Dance read an extract from the autobiography of Rylan Clark. The mystery guest was Jerry Dyer, the creator and narrator of the YouTube channel Big Jet TV, whose livestream of planes attempting to land at Heathrow Airport during Storm Eunice went viral.

The Big Fat Question was a three part question asked by Johannes Radebe, who was dressed as a US Air Force pilot and 'parachuted' into the studio in honour of Top Gun: Maverick being the year's highest grossing film.

 The Big Fat Anniversary Quiz 

 The Big Fat Anniversary Quiz (2007) 
 
A special edition of the show, celebrating Channel 4's 25th anniversary, was broadcast on 2 November 2007. Carr and Dee emerged victorious at the climax, and so had to take part in a special challenge which replicated the finale of The Crystal Maze. The pair had to collect silver and gold pieces of paper being blown around in a glass dome.

Vic Reeves and Joanna Fisher, who was a member of 1980s Channel 4 programme Minipops both came into the studio to ask bonus questions. Jon Snow read out a fake news report on The Snowman. Quentin Tarantino, Anna Friel, Jonathan Ross, Ram John Holder, Derren Brown, Jo Frost, Jools Holland and others appeared on pre-recorded filmed questions. The children of Mitchell Brook Primary school acted out classic Channel 4 programmes The Word and TFI Friday.

The Big Fat Anniversary Quiz (2015)
 
The second Big Fat Anniversary Quiz was recorded on 29 September 2014 and aired on 2 January 2015, to mark the tenth anniversary of the series.

Pre-recorded guest questions came from Ian McKellen, Paul Hollywood and Mary Berry, Chico, Gregg Wallace, Ellie Simmonds, Peter Andre and Abbey Clancy. Louie Spence provided the in-studio guest question in the form of an interpretive dance about the 2013 horse meat scandal. Charles Dance read from the autobiography of Jay-Z. The children of Mitchell Brook Primary School acted out the launch of the Large Hadron Collider in 2008. Jon Snow gave his news report about "Sex on Fire". The mystery guest was Jon Morter, who started the Facebook campaign to make Rage Against the Machine's "Killing in the Name" the Christmas number 1 in 2009. A Dalek also appeared in the studio to ask the final bonus question, and to "exterminate" Carr at the end of the quiz. Brand and Fielding referenced their previous name as the "Goth Detectives" several times. They got many of their correct answers from an ongoing text conversation with members of the live studio audience. The ruse was discovered when Carr took Brand's phone, called one of the numbers, and an audience member answered. Chico also appeared via text, responding to Jack Whitehall.

The Big Fat Quiz of EverythingThe Big Fat Quiz of Everything is a spin-off series to the annual. These quizzes ask questions based on various subjects including history, geography, films, television, music, science, technology, art, literature, sports and games.

2016 special

The first special was recorded in October 2015 and aired on 5 January 2016.

Pre-recorded guest questions came from Little Mix, Gareth Malone, Paul Whitehouse, Joey Essex, Jessica Ennis-Hill, Dom and Steph Parker from Gogglebox, Kevin McCloud, Darcey Bussell and Alesha Dixon. Chris Kamara provided the in-studio guest question. The children of Mitchell Brook Primary School acted out The Great Fire of London. Jon Snow reported on Queen's "Bohemian Rhapsody".

2016 series

A three-part series of The Big Fat Quiz of Everything was recorded in June and July 2016 at The London Studios.

Episode 1

The first episode aired on 15 August 2016.

Pre-recorded guest questions came from Buzz Aldrin, Deborah Meaden from Dragons' Den, Joey Essex, Rylan Clark, Warwick Davis and David Haye. The in-studio guest questions were asked by First Dates maitre d' Fred Sirieix (who proceeded to open a large bottle of champagne and serve it to the contestants and the studio audience) and Strictly Come Dancing pair Kevin and Karen Clifton, who performed a series of dances in a minute for the contestants to guess. The children of Mitchell Brook Primary School acted out the Watergate scandal. Jon Snow reported on the Village People's "YMCA".

Episode 2

The second episode aired on 22 August 2016.

Pre-recorded guest questions came from Jodie Kidd, Dr. Christian Jessen, Joey Essex, Ronan Keating, Jerry Springer and Eddie "The Eagle" Edwards. The children of Mitchell Brook Primary School acted out the Wars of the Roses. Jon Snow reported on The B-52's "Love Shack". The Mariachis appeared to play TV themes in a mariachi style for the final question.

Episode 3

The third episode aired on 28 August 2016.

Pre-recorded guest questions came from Jess Glynne, Made in Chelseas Jamie Laing, Ricky Wilson, Ray Mears and Joey Essex. The children of Mitchell Brook Primary School acted out Henry VIII's dissolution of the monasteries. Jon Snow reported on Sir Mix-a-Lot's "Baby Got Back". Two sloths appeared in the studio for a question about the seven deadly sins, and three human statues replicated famous historical statues for the final question.

2017 special

The second New Year special was recorded in October 2016 and aired on Friday 6 January 2017.

Pre-recorded guest questions came from Joe Wicks, Nick Hewer, Joey Essex, Laura and Jason Kenny, Derren Brown, Ollie Locke from Made in Chelsea and Darcey Bussell. Jonnie Peacock provided the in-studio guest question in the form of sporting celebrations. The children of Mitchell Brook Primary School acted out the Napster lawsuits. Jon Snow reported on The Weather Girls' "It's Raining Men". Charles Dance read confusing movie reviews from Amazon customers. The London Philharmonic Choir appeared to sing popular hip-hop and rap tunes in a choral style for the final question.

2018 special

The third New Year special was recorded on 11 December 2017 at Television Centre and aired on Friday 12 January 2018.

Pre-recorded guest questions came from Luke Evans, Ore Oduba, Dynamo, Christian Slater, Judy Murray and Reverend Kate Bottley. The children of Mitchell Brook Primary School acted out Garry Kasparov's defeat to Deep Blue. Jon Snow reported on Billy Ray Cyrus' "Achy Breaky Heart". Charles Dance read confusing online film reviews. The mystery guests were John Cornelius, Robbie Humphries and Anthony Eden, who all played The Milkybar Kid as children. The Big Fat Question featured several football team mascots for the teams to identify.

2019 special

The fourth New Year special was recorded at BBC Elstree Studios on 21 November 2018 and aired on 4 January 2019. The teams did not take team names.

Pre-recorded guest questions came from Brendan O'Carroll, Stacey Solomon, Eric Idle, Asim Chaudhry (in character as Chabuddy G from People Just Do Nothing), Basil Brush, Clara Amfo and Boyzone. The in-studio guest questions were provided by This Morning's Dr. Ranj who asked the teams to identify different muscles and bones in the body, and First Dates barman Merlin Griffiths who asked the teams to identify the cocktails he was mixing. The children of Mitchell Brook Primary School acted out the construction of the Channel Tunnel. Charles Dance read terrible online film reviews. Jon Snow reported on "Milkshake" by Kelis. The mystery guests were Alex and Sue Tatham, the first Blind Date wedding couple. Doppelgangers of Tom Hanks, Will Smith, Robert Downey Jr., Emma Watson, Dwayne Johnson and Julia Roberts appeared for the Big Fat Question for the teams to put in order of highest-grossing film stars.

 2021 special 

The fifth special aired on 7 January 2021.

Pre-recorded questions came from Paloma Faith, Billy Ocean, Ralph Macchio, Maggie Aderin-Pocock, Clare Balding, Tim Minchin, and Roman Kemp. The children of Mitchell Brook Primary School acted out the theft and recovery of the 1966 World Cup for a related question. Jon Snow reported on Radiohead's "Creep". Charles Dance reads book reviews from Jane Eyre, Twilight, and Moby Dick. The special guest was Barbadian British voice-over actor Redd Pepper, who offered to read Taglines from four famous movies. The mystery guest was Jessica Smith, the Sun Baby in Teletubbies.
The final question was a round in which The London Street Band played 4 different longest number one tracks from 70s-00s, and the teams had to guess the songs in their respective decades.

 2022 special 

The sixth special aired on 3 April 2022.

Pre-recorded questions came from Katie Piper, Daniel Mays, Gemma Whelan, Annie Mac, Kye Whyte, Paul Hollywood and Hannah Cockroft. The children of Mitchell Brook Primary School acted out the Cottingley Fairy hoax. Charles Dance read bad online reviews of The Lord of the Rings, Fifty Shades of Grey and Animal Farm. Clarkson's Farm star Kaleb Cooper appeared in the studio to ask a question about animals. The mystery guests were Ben Cooke, Mark Higgins and Bobby Hanton, who were all stunt doubles for Daniel Craig in various James Bond films. The Big Fat Question involved lookalikes of Elton John, Diana Ross, Ed Sheeran, Stormzy and Lady Gaga, with the teams having to place them in order of most weeks spent at number one in the UK Singles Chart.

The Big Fat Quiz of the Decade
In 2012, three Big Fat Quizzes were recorded as part of Channel 4's 30th anniversary celebrations, each representing one of the past decades. The shows were recorded on 30 August, 12 September and 19 September.

The Big Fat Quiz of the '80s

The show was recorded on 12 September 2012 and aired on 16 September 2012. The teams did not take team names for this special.

In-studio guest questions were provided by Kriss Akabusi and Samantha Fox, who presented the final bonus question. Recorded guest questions were provided by Su Pollard, Michael Fish, Clare Grogan, Roland Rat, Nik Kershaw, The Proclaimers, Anne Charleston, Charles Dance (doing a dramatic reading from the autobiography of The Krankies), and Sonia. The children of Mitchell Brook Primary School made an appearance acting out Live Aid. Providing the song lyric as news story segment was original Newsround anchor John Craven, reporting on "Thriller". Bunty Bailey, the actress who played the female love interest in a-ha's "Take On Me", appeared as a mystery guest.  The four winners were "presented" a Sinclair C5 by Samantha Fox.

The Big Fat Quiz of the '90s

The show was recorded on 19 September 2012 and aired on 23 September 2012. The teams did not take team names for this special.

The in-studio final bonus questions were provided (after a fashion) by Mr Blobby. Recorded guest questions were provided by Zig and Zag, Chesney Hawkes, B*Witched members Lindsay Armaou and Keavy Lynch, Laurence Llewelyn-Bowen, Vic and Bob (Vic Reeves and Bob Mortimer), Linford Christie, and Charles Dance (doing a dramatic reading from the autobiography of Melanie Brown). The children of Mitchell Brook Primary School made an appearance acting out the launch and repair of the Hubble Space Telescope.  Providing the song lyric as news story segment was former BBC Nine O'Clock News presenter Michael Buerk, reporting on "I'm Too Sexy". John Simmit and Nikky Smedley, the portrayers of Teletubbies Dipsy and Laa-Laa (respectively), appeared as mystery guests.

The Big Fat Quiz of the '00s

The show was recorded on 30 August 2012 and aired on 30 September 2012.

The in-studio final bonus questions were provided by the Cheeky Girls.  Dragons' Den dragon Duncan Bannatyne provided a live guest question.  Recorded guest questions were provided by Gregg Wallace, Nick Bateman, Peter Andre, half of McFly, Gareth Gates, Tara Palmer-Tomkinson, and Charles Dance (doing a dramatic reading from the autobiography of Katie Price). The children of Mitchell Brook Primary School made an appearance acting out the cheating scandal on Who Wants to Be a Millionaire?. Providing the song lyric as news story segment was Channel 4 News presenter and Big Fat Quiz regular Jon Snow, reporting on "It Wasn't Me". Howard Davies-Carr and his two sons Harry and Charlie, stars of the popular viral video Charlie Bit My Finger appeared as mystery guests. Big Brother voiceover announcer Marcus Bentley read the final scores.

2013 specials

Due to the success of the decades specials in 2012, Channel 4 commissioned two additional specials to air in the autumn of 2013.

The Big Fat Quiz of the '80s (2013)

The show aired on 22 September 2013. The teams did not take team names for this special.

Anneka Rice provided a live guest question. The mystery guest was Stelios Havatzios, the 1980s Athena Baby in the L'Enfant poster.  Recorded guest questions were provided by Toyah Willcox, Kim Wilde, Jim Bowen, Bob Carolgees, Carol Decker, Trevor and Simon (Going Live!), Tony Robinson, Gordon Burns and Charles Dance (doing a dramatic reading from the autobiography of Chas & Dave's Chas). The children of Goldsmith Community Hall made an appearance acting out Operation Deepscan. Providing the song lyric as news story segment was John Craven, reporting on "Total Eclipse of the Heart".

The Big Fat Quiz of the '90s (2013)

The show aired on 29 September 2013. The teams did not take team names for this special.

Diane Youdale (the one-time Gladiator Jet) provided a live guest question. The mystery guest was Todd Watkins, who gained fame for kissing a 77-year-old woman on a The Word segment called "The Hopefuls".  Recorded guest questions were provided by Mr. Motivator, Goldie, Andi Peters, Tony Mortimer, Melinda Messenger, Daniela Nardini, Sally Gunnell, The Shamen's Mr. C, the members of Hanson and Charles Dance (doing a dramatic reading from the autobiography of Vanilla Ice). The children of Goldsmith Community Hall made an appearance acting out the cloning of Dolly the sheep played by Hannah MacDonald. Providing the song lyric as news story segment was Martyn Lewis, reporting on "Livin' la Vida Loca". In the penultimate round, Carr announced that he had hired the gunge tank from Noel's House Party and the losers would be gunged, however Ross convinced Carr himself to go in it and was gunged by Jet.

The Big Fat Quiz of the Decade (2020)

The show aired on 2 January 2020.

Jimmy was joined by Pikachu for a live question themed on Pokémon. The mystery guests were two actors and a dog who had appeared in various John Lewis Christmas adverts during the decade. Recorded guest questions were provided by Jourdan Dunn, Scarlett Moffatt, Bear Grylls, Sophia the Robot, Peter Crouch, Oti Mabuse and McFly. Jon Snow provided the song lyric as news story segment, reporting on "Get Lucky". Charles Dance gave readings of online reviews of films. The children of Mitchell Brook Primary School made an appearance acting out the rescue of the Chilean miners. The final question was asked by Charlotte Crosby, dressed as Miley Cyrus in the Wrecking Ball video.

Notes

References

External links
 The Big Fat Quiz of the Year 
 
 
 The Big Fat Quiz of the Year'' at IMDb: 2004, 2005, 2006, 2007, 2008, 2010

The Big Fat Anniversary Quiz 
 

2004 British television series debuts
2010s British television series
2020s British television series
2000s British game shows
2010s British game shows
2020s British game shows
Annual television shows
British panel games
Channel 4 comedy
Channel 4 panel games
New Year's television specials
Television shows shot at BBC Elstree Centre
Television shows shot at Elstree Film Studios